In Greek mythology, the name Molus (/ˈmoʊləs/; Ancient Greek: Μῶλος Molos means "toil and moil") was a warrior from Argos who came with king Sthenelus to join the Trojan War. He was killed by Agenor, son of the Trojan elder, Antenor

Mythology

Quintus Smyrnaeus' Account 
Agenor smote Molus the princely, — with king Sthenelus he came from Argos, — hurled from far behind a dart new-whetted, as he fled from fight, piercing his right leg, and the eager shaft cut sheer through the broad sinew, shattering the bones with anguished pain: and so his doom met him, to die a death of agony.

Note 

Characters in Greek mythology

References 

 Quintus Smyrnaeus, The Fall of Troy translated by Way. A. S. Loeb Classical Library Volume 19. London: William Heinemann, 1913. Online version at theio.com
 Quintus Smyrnaeus, The Fall of Troy. Arthur S. Way. London: William Heinemann; New York: G.P. Putnam's Sons. 1913. Greek text available at the Perseus Digital Library.